Salim Sarai (also Romanized as Salīm Sarā’ī) is a village in Gol Tappeh Rural District, Gol Tappeh District, Kabudarahang County, Hamadan Province, Iran. At the 2006 census, its population was 84, in 18 families.

References 

Populated places in Kabudarahang County